Out of Reach is a 2004 American action film directed by Po-Chih Leong, written by Trevor Miller, and starring Steven Seagal and Ida Nowakowska. The film was released on direct-to-DVD in the United States on July 20, 2004.  Seagal plays William Lansing, a former covert agent turned survivalist, tracking a human trafficking ring and trying to rescue his pen pal, a thirteen-year-old orphan from Poland whom he has taught to use secret codes.

Plot
Vietnam veteran and retired CSA agent William Lansing works on a wildlife refuge in Northern Alaska, and has been exchanging letters in a pen-pal relationship with Irena Morawska, a 13-year-old orphaned girl in Warsaw, Poland that he is helping out financially. When the letters suddenly stop coming, Lansing heads to Poland to figure out the reason. He discovers that the orphanage that Irena was staying in, which is financed by honest – and unsuspecting – good intentioned Samaritans, is a front for a human trafficking syndicate run by a notorious crime boss and freelance terrorist named Faisal.

The operation is worth billions and all the girls are sold and traded to the highest bidders from all over the world. Through his letters to Irena, Lansing has taught Irena how to use secret codes, which she uses to keep him updated on where Faisal is taking her to. Lansing stays on Faisal's trail, teaming up with Polish police detective Kasia Lato to rescue Irena and the other girls, and bring down Faisal's human trafficking network.

Cast
 Steven Seagal as William Lansing
 Ida Nowakowska as Irena Morawska
 Agnieszka Wagner as Kasia Lato
 Matt Schulze as Faisal
 Krzysztof Pieczyński as Ibo
 Robbie Gee as Lewis Morton
 Murat Yilmaz as Azimi
 Nick Brimble as Mister Elgin
 Jan Plazalski as Nikki
 Shawn Lawrence as Agent Shepherd
 Hanna Dunowska as Rosie
 Frank Hildebrand as Postmaster
 Klaudia Jakacka as Petra
 Jan Janga-Tomaszewski as Uncle Pawel
 Maria Maj as Mrs. Donata

Production
The film was shot in Warsaw, Mazowieckie, Poland.  Production began in August 2003.

For large portions of the movie, Seagal was dubbed over by a voice over artist. So at certain times during the movie he speaks with his own voice, but then at other times with a dubbed voice which can be detected very easily as being dubbed. The reasoning for the dubbing of Seagal and other actors in the film was that changes were made in the storyline after most of the film was already shot.

Home media
Columbia TriStar Home Entertainment released the DVD in Region 1 in the United States on July 20, 2004, and Region 2 in the United Kingdom on August 23, 2004.

Reception
Robert Pardi of TV Guide rated it 1/4 stars and wrote, "Seagal's declining career found him making low-rent thrillers like this awkward, European-financed mix of social causes and unconvincing kickboxing sequences".  Beyond Hollywood called it the strangest and most unintentionally funny Seagal film, in part due to the dubbing.  Carl Davis of DVD Talk rated it 2/5 stars and wrote, "Out of Reach isn't a bad waste of time, but it is a bad waste of talent."  Mitchell Hattawa of DVD Verdict called the film too confusing to understand.  Daniel Bettridge of The Guardian included the film in his list of Seagal's silliest roles.

References

External links
 

2004 films
2004 direct-to-video films
2004 action thriller films
American action thriller films
Direct-to-video action films
Films about terrorism
Films scored by Alex Heffes
Films shot in Poland
Franchise Pictures films
2000s English-language films
2000s American films